Never Been Rocked Enough is a studio album by the American musician Delbert McClinton. It was released in 1992 by Curb Records. The first single was "Every Time I Roll the Dice". McClinton supported the album with a North American tour.

Production
The album was produced by McClinton, Jim Horn, Don Was, and Bonnie Raitt; the two recording sessions took about a week and a half. Tom Petty and Melissa Etheridge provided backing vocals. "Have a Little Faith in Me" is a cover of the John Hiatt song. McClinton considered Never Been Rocked Enough to be his most radio-friendly album.

Critical reception

The Calgary Herald concluded that "this isn't so much a sentimentalization of McClinton's brand of bar music, as its apotheosis." The Boston Globe determined that the album "captures his rough-edged, yet somehow polished, roadhouse sound."

The Windsor Star panned "the slick session musicians like the World's Most Dangerous Band." The Ottawa Citizen stated that "the album doesn't blow you away with volume or flash, but wins you over with its roots rockin' integrity and deep-brewed flavors of the southern U.S."

In a review for AllMusic, Roch Parisien wrote: "The results cover the whole checkerboard while remaining vintage McClinton: his harp wails on 'Everytime I Roll the Dice'; 'Can I Change My Mind' flirts with Motown soul; 'Blues as Blues Can Get' defines the confessional blues ballad."

Chart performance
In the US, Never Been Rocked Enough peaked at number 118 on the Billboard 200 in July 18, 1992.

Track listing

Personnel
Delbert McClinton - vocals, harmonica, percussion
Randy Jacobs, Turner Stephen Bruton, Waddy Wachtel, Dann Huff, Sid McGinnis, Cornell Dupree, Fred Knobloch - guitar
Tom Petty - harmony vocals on "Why Me?"
Francine Reed - harmony vocals on "I Used to Worry"
Bonnie Raitt - slide guitar, acoustic guitar, vocals
James "Hutch" Hutchinson, Will Lee, Francisco Centeno - bass guitar
Benmont Tench - Hammond B3 organ, piano
Ivan Neville - Hammond B3 organ
Paul Shaffer - piano, DX7, Wurlitzer, organ
Mike Duke - piano, backing vocals
Kenny Aronoff, Anton Fig, Curt Bisquera - drums
Styhak Levy, Tom Roady, Debra Dobkin - percussion
Bill Bergman - tenor saxophone
Greg Smith - baritone saxophone
Uptown Horns - horns
Jim Horn - soprano saxophone, horn arrangements
John Berry - trumpet
Melissa Etheridge, Donna McElroy, Vicki Hampton - backing vocals

Charts

References

External links
 Never Been Rocked Enough at Curb Records
 
 

Delbert McClinton albums
1992 albums
Curb Records albums
Albums produced by Don Was